Roridomyces irritans is a species of fungus in the genus Roridomyces, family Mycenaceae. Originally described from New Caledonia as Mycena irritans by Egon Horak in 1978, the species was transferred to Roridomyces in 1994. The fruit bodies are bioluminescent.

See also
List of bioluminescent fungus species

References

External links

Bioluminescent fungi
Mycenaceae
Fungi of the Caribbean
Fungi described in 1978